The 50th series of University Challenge began on 13 July 2020 on BBC Two and ended on 5 April 2021. It was won by the University of Warwick.

COVID-19
Due to the COVID-19 pandemic, University Challenge took a six-month hiatus from filming episodes. Recording resumed with the highest scoring losers play-offs, with contestants now separated by perspex screens and wearing ear-pieces to allow them to hear their teammates. The show also relaxed the rule that banned students from competing if they completed their degree during the recording of the series.

The University of Manchester and three Oxford colleges – Merton, Balliol and Corpus Christi – all fielded reserves when filming resumed.

Results
 Winning teams are highlighted in bold.
 Teams with green scores (winners) returned in the next round, while those with red scores (losers) were eliminated.
 Teams with orange scores had to win one more match to return in the next round.
 Teams with yellow scores indicate that two further matches had to be played and won (teams that lost their first quarter-final match).
 A score in italics indicates a match decided on a tie-breaker question.

First round

Highest scoring losers play-offs

Second round

Quarterfinals

Semifinals

Final

 The trophy and title were awarded to the Warwick team comprising Richard Pollard, George Braid, captain Andrew Rout and Owain Burrell.
 Simon Armitage, Poet Laureate and former Oxford Professor of Poetry, presented the trophy; he had captained a University of Manchester team in the Christmas series in 2016.

Spin-off: Christmas Special 2020

First round
Each year, a Christmas special sequence is aired featuring distinguished alumni. Out of 7 first-round winners, the top 4 highest-scoring teams progress to the semi-finals. The teams consist of celebrities who represent their alma maters.
Winning teams are highlighted in bold.
Teams with green scores (winners) returned in the next round, while those with red scores (losers) were eliminated.
Teams with grey scores won their match but did not achieve a high enough score to proceed to the next round.
A score in italics indicates a match decided on a tie-breaker question.

Standings for the winners

Semi-finals

Final

The winning The Courtauld Institute of Art team consisted of Tim Marlow, Lavinia Greenlaw, Jacky Klein and Jeremy Deller beat the University of Manchester and their team of David Nott, Juliet Jacques, Ade Edmondson and Justin Edwards.

References

External links
University Challenge homepage
Blanchflower Results Table

2020
2020 British television seasons
2021 British television seasons